Clinton Paul Townsend (July 31, 1868 – August 3, 1931) was chemist known for the development of the Townsend cell for the chloralkali process.

References

1868 births
1931 deaths
20th-century American chemists
19th-century American chemists